Fimbul Glacier, is a glacier in eastern Greenland. 

This glacier was named after an Old Norse word for "giant" or "mighty".

Geography 
The Fimbul Glacier originates in western Odinland, a glaciated peninsula. It flows southward from the area of the Ensomme Skraent ('Lonely Slope'), and joins the Sleipner Glacier from its left side just north of its terminus in the Bernstorff Fjord (Kangertittivaq) and west of the Brages Range. Alfheimbjerg is a mountain further south, rising between the western side of the Fimbul Glacier terminus and the terminus of the Bernstorff Glacier . Together the Sleipner and Fimbul glaciers produce massive amounts of ice that blocks the fjord.

Bibliography
Climate-related glacier fluctuations in southeast Greenland

See also
List of glaciers in Greenland

References

External links
Southeast Greenland glaciers to warm Atlantic Water from Operation IceBridge and Ocean Melting Greenland data - ResearchGate 
Not so green - Odin Land
Glaciers of Greenland
Odinland